Klasky is a Slavic surname. Notable people with the surname include:

 Arlene Klasky, an American animator, graphic designer, television producer
 Klasky Csupo, Inc., the company formed by (and named after) her and Csupo 
 Mindy L. Klasky, an American fantasy novelist

See also 
 Nike, Inc. v. Marc K(l)asky
 Klaski

Slavic-language surnames